The Togtogquwo railway station or the Tuotuohe railway station is a station on the Chinese Qinghai–Tibet Railway. It is located at  near the railway bridge over the Tuotuo River (Tuótuóhé), which is considered the headwaters of China's great Yangtze River. (Further downstream, it is known in China as the Tongtian River, Jinsha River, and finally the Changjiang).

Although both the river (Tuotuohe) and the seat of Tanggulashan Town (Tuotuoheyan) are known in Tibetan as Mar Qu. the official Tibetan name of this railway station is Togtogquwo.

The station is located next to the main urban area, such as there is, of Tanggula Town.

Climate

See also
 Qinghai–Tibet Railway
 List of stations on Qinghai–Tibet railway

References

Railway stations in Qinghai
Stations on the Qinghai–Tibet Railway
Haixi Mongol and Tibetan Autonomous Prefecture